Edward L. Gibbs (born October 28, 1968) is an American politician who is currently representing the 68th district in the New York State Assembly since 2022. He is the first formerly incarcerated New York Assembly member.

Early life and incarceration 
Born the second-eldest of four, Gibbs was raised in public housing in East Harlem by a single mother. His family lived off of welfare. As a teenager, Gibbs sold crack cocaine to support his family.

At 17 years old, Gibbs was stabbed in the leg in an attempted robbery. In an act of self defense, Gibbs shot and killed his attacker before turning himself in at a local police station. He spent 17 months on Rikers Island before accepting a plea deal. Gibbs then served time at the Elmira, Cayuga, and Mid-State Correctional Facilities. In prison, he received his GED and associate degree.

References 

Living people
New York (state) Democrats
21st-century American politicians
1968 births